Talaguppa is a village located in Sagara Taluk in Karnataka State, India. The National Highway No.206 (Bengaluru - Honnavara) passes through Talaguppa village. The village is 14.37 km from the taluk's center Sagara, 77.68 km from  
Shivamogga, and 373 km from Bengaluru. It is located at a distance of 
14 km from Jog Falls, the highest waterfall in India and Talaguppa is the linking Railway terminus for Jog falls. Areca nut and paddy are the most grown crops.

Shrines
There are three major temples in this village.
 Shree Kadambeshwar temple
 Shree Veerabhadreshwar temple
 Shree Ranganath temple
 Shree Chaudeshwari Temple Yadavakeri 
There is a mosque as well as a church near Travellers Bungalow.

Nearby villages are Kanle (5.294 km), Shiravanthe 
(7.201 km), Syduru (7.446 km), Masuru 
(11.78 km), Keladi (11.82 km), Sagara city 
(14.37 km), Malve (15.26 km).

Transport
Talaguppa is connected by Rail from Bengaluru and Shivamogga and connecting point to Jog Falls.
After the broad gauge conversion, Indian railways has introduced a daily
train in betweenMysuru Talaguppa, and Mysuru - Talaguppa 
Bengaluru - Talaguppa Express, Shivamogga Town - Talaguppa Passenger.
Intercity express.

The metre gauge railway track between the town of Shivamogga and 
Talaguppa was laid by the British in 1938. In 1939, Mirza Ismail took 
the maiden journey on this line to visit the city of Sagara. This rail 
link provided access to Jog Falls, which is 12 km from 
Talaguppa. Famous personalities like Nalvadi Krishnaraja Wodeyar, 
Jayachamarajendra Wodeyar, Sir M Visvesvaraya, Lal Bahadur Shastri and 
Morarji Desai used this line to reach Jog Falls.

There is a proposal to connect Talaguppa with Honnavara in Uttara 
Kannada district by a new railway line, which will be a shorter 
alternate rail route between Mumbai and southern India.

Karnataka State Road Transport Corporation and private bus services are 
available to Talaguppa.

References

http://www.deccanherald.com/content/79450/railcars-last-stop.html

Villages in Shimoga district